Champions League 2009 may refer to:
 2009 Champions League Twenty20
 AFC Champions League 2009
 CAF Champions League 2009
 The UEFA Champions League:
 2008–09 UEFA Champions League
 2009–10 UEFA Champions League
 CONCACAF Champions League:
 2009–10 CONCACAF Champions League
 2008–09 CONCACAF Champions League